Cherif-Touré Mamam (born 13 January 1978) is a Togolese former professional footballer who played as a midfielder for the Togo national team.

Club career
During his time at Livingston, Touré wore number 91. This is said to be his lucky number from his childhood as he had a basketball shirt bearing that number. He also had "Sheriff" on the shirt but the Scottish Premier League ordered him to use his real name. His most memorable moment at Livingston was scoring twice in a 5–1 win at Motherwell in October 2002.

Touré was in January 2005 on a trial with Norwegian club SK Brann, where he claimed that he was born in 1985 and that he had never played for any clubs in Europe, despite having previously played for the Scottish side Livingston where he was registered as born in 1981. One of Brann's players, Charlie Miller who had previously played for Dundee United, asked him if he was the same player as the one who used to play for Livingston, but Toure denied this.

International career
Touré was a member of the Togo national team and played in the 1998, 2000, 2006 African Cup of Nations, and was called up to the 2006 World Cup in Germany. He is the only Togolese player in history to score a goal for Togo at a FIFA World Cup.

Personal life
His brother Souleymane Mamam also plays for the Togolese National side.  Although Mamam is the family name, Cherif Touré has his Christian names on the back of his shirt.

References

External links
 
 
 
 

1978 births
Living people
People from Mango, Togo
Association football midfielders
Togolese footballers
Togo international footballers
2006 FIFA World Cup players
1998 African Cup of Nations players
2000 African Cup of Nations players
2006 Africa Cup of Nations players
Eintracht Frankfurt II players
Hannover 96 players
Olympique de Marseille players
Livingston F.C. players
MC Alger players
Al-Nasr SC (Dubai) players
Al Jazira Club players
FC Rapid București players
Étoile Filante du Togo players
FC Metz players
FC Sens players
Liga I players
Ligue 1 players
Scottish Premier League players
UAE Pro League players
Togolese expatriate footballers
Expatriate footballers in Scotland
Togolese expatriate sportspeople in Germany
Expatriate footballers in Germany
Togolese expatriate sportspeople in France
Expatriate footballers in France
Togolese expatriate sportspeople in Romania
Expatriate footballers in Romania
Expatriate footballers in Algeria
Expatriate footballers in the United Arab Emirates
21st-century Togolese people